Salvia lobbii is a species of flowering plant in the family Lamiaceae that is native to Ecuador. The plant is named after William Lobb (1809–1864), the English plant collector.

References

lobbii
Flora of Ecuador
Data deficient plants
Taxonomy articles created by Polbot